The 1997 New York Jets season was the franchise's 28th season in the National Football League (NFL) and the 38th overall. Sparked by the arrival of head coach Bill Parcells, who replaced Rich Kotite, and was coming off a Super Bowl berth the previous season, they improved upon its league-worst and franchise-worst 1–15 record from 1996 finishing at 9–7, but narrowly missed the playoffs after losing their final game of the season. It was their first winning season since 1988.

Offseason 
For most of the end of the 1996 season, the Jets were courting Parcells to take over their football operations. This drew criticism from the team that employed Parcells at the time, the New England Patriots, who were in the middle of a push that eventually led to a loss in Super Bowl XXXI. Parcells made a now-famous statement regarding the Patriots’ unwillingness to give him more of a say in football matters: "If they want you to cook the dinner, at least they ought to let you shop for some of the groceries."

Parcells eventually announced his resignation but was bound by the terms of his contract with the Patriots, which forbade him from coaching anywhere else until the contract expired. To temporarily resolve the situation the Jets hired Bill Belichick, Parcells’ top assistant, to be the coach and hired Parcells for an advisory role. The Patriots were unamused, and complained to the league. Eventually commissioner Paul Tagliabue brokered a deal with the two teams where Parcells would be able to coach the Jets and the Patriots would receive the Jets' first round draft pick the next year. This allowed the Jets to avoid sending the number-one overall pick in the 1997 NFL Draft, which they had earned from their 1–15 finish, to the Patriots (which New England had initially demanded in order to allow Parcells to move to the Jets).

In regards to that pick, two players were on the Jets’ radar. One was Ohio State offensive lineman Orlando Pace, who was coming out of school a year early. The other was Tennessee quarterback Peyton Manning, who had graduated from school in three years but still had a year of eligibility left, yet was expected by many to come out for the draft. Manning announced he would return to Tennessee for his senior season, and instead of taking Pace with the #1 pick the Jets traded it to the St. Louis Rams. The Jets instead drafted Virginia linebacker James Farrior.

NFL Draft

Roster

Regular season

Schedule

Notable Games 
 August 31 @ Seattle Seahawks
The new-look Jets erupted in their first game under Bill Parcells. Neil O'Donnell threw three first-half touchdowns while rookie John Hall booted a 55-yard field goal and later a 28-yarder. Despite leading 27–3 at the half, Parcells forcefully reminded them, “They say you can't hold a lead. They say you blew six games last year where you were leading at the half. Let’s see what you’re made of.” The Jets responded with two more O'Donnell touchdowns in the third quarter while shutting out the Seahawks. Warren Moon, making his Seattle debut, was limited to seven completions and a pick while backup John Friesz was only slightly better with ten completions. The Jets posted only their fifth win (41–3 final) in their previous 40 games.

 September 14 @ New England Patriots
On Sunday Night Football former Patriots coach Parcells met former Jets coach Pete Carroll at Foxboro Stadium with the Jets 1–1 following a 28–22 loss to Buffalo and the Patriots 2–0. The pregame buildup was huge and the ensuing game turned into a grinder. Drew Bledsoe's touchdown to Ben Coates and a Curtis Martin score were answered by a two-yard O'Donnell rushing score and a John Hall field goal. Bledsoe was picked off by Mo Lewis for a 43-yard Jets touchdown. After Adam Vinatieri tied the game in the third Bledsoe found Lovett Purnell and a 24–17 Patriots lead. Despite being sacked seven times O'Donnell tied the game on a 24-yard score to Keyshawn Johnson, and after forcing a Patriots punt the Jets were in position to win in the final seconds, but Hall's field goal try was blocked by Mike Jones and the game went to overtime. The Patriots clawed down field and Vinatieri finished it on a 34-yard field goal and a 27–24 Patriots win.

 September 21 vs. Oakland Raiders
The 1–2 Jets rebounded from the loss when they faced the 1–2 Raiders. Jeff George threw three first-half touchdowns (marred by a missed PAT and missed two-point try) and the Raiders led 22–10 at the half. But from there the Jets special teams surged to the fore; John Hall booted two field goals and in the fourth Cole Ford's 28-yard field goal try was blocked by Corwin Brown; Ray Mickens ran the ball 72 yards for the winning touchdown and a 23–22 final; Ford missed four field goal attempts in all.  The win snapped a string of 13 consecutive home losses for the Jets.

 October 19 vs. New England Patriots
Entering Week Eight the AFC East race in 1997 had become a four-way fight with the Patriots entering at 5–1, the Jets 5–2, the Dolphins 4–2, and the Bills 3–3; Miami (vs. Baltimore) and Buffalo (vs. winless Indianapolis) would win their games this weekend to stay in the division hunt. In The Meadowlands the Jets scored first on a John Hall field goal, then the Patriots outscored the Jets 19–7 after sacking Neil O'Donnell in the endzone and then getting a Vinatieri field goal and an eight-yard Ben Coates touchdown before Troy Brown caught a 23-yarder. But from there the Patriots fell; Neil O'Donnell was benched and Glenn Foley led the Jets back; Adrian Murrell ran in a five-yard score and later Foley hit Lorenzo Neal. The Jets snuffed out New England's long passes and finished up 24–19 entering their bye week.

 November 9 @ Miami Dolphins
Glenn Foley threw for 322 yards and a touchdown to Kyle Brady but was intercepted once. Dan Marino had a touchdown to Brett Perriman while Karim Abdul-Jabbar had two rushing scores. The 24–17 Dolphins win put both teams plus New England in a three-way tie for the AFC East lead at 6–4 with Buffalo at 5–5; it was also Marino's final victory over the Jets.

 November 23 vs. Minnesota Vikings
Leon Johnson opened scoring by returning a Vikings punt 66 yards for a touchdown. The Jets raced to a 23–7 lead in the third quarter, but in the fourth the Vikings behind Brad Johnson scored twice on touchdowns to Jake Reed and Andrew Glover; a 2-point conversion attempt after Glover's score was stopped, securing the 23–21 win and the first .500 season for the Jets since 1993.

 December 14 vs. Tampa Bay Buccaneers
After losing two straight, falling to 8–6, the Jets authored their most decisive win of the season as they limited the Bucs to 136 total yards and three turnovers. Trent Dilfer was picked off twice by Otis Smith and Smith ran back touchdowns for a combined 96 yards. Leon Johnson opened the third quarter by running back the kickoff 101 yards for another touchdown, and Adrian Murrell finished off the scoring on a seven-yarder in the third. The 31–0 score put the Jets within reach of a division title and secured their first outright winning season since 1988.

 December 21 @ Detroit Lions
With the 9–6 Dolphins hosting the 9–6 Patriots on Monday Night Football the 9–6 Jets had a chance for a Wild Card berth. The Jets clawed out front on ten first-quarter points, but the Lions led by Barry Sanders began storming back. Two Jason Hanson field goals in the second and third quarters were followed by a 25-yard Sanders touchdown. Neil O'Donnell had been rotated in and out under center during the season, but after going 21–35 for 202 yards and a pick Bill Parcells called for others to start throwing the ball. On a halfback option Leon Johnson threw for the endzone but was intercepted. Later rookie Ray Lucas rushed for 30 yards and completed three passes for 28 yards, but was intercepted in the endzone. This ended the Jets' hopes of the postseason in a 13–10 Lions win. The game was marred by near-tragedy, however; on a scramble for an Adrian Murrell fumble Lions linebacker Reggie Brown struck his head into the back of a falling player; he suffered a spinal cord injury and was paralyzed; he lost consciousness but CPR saved his life; he was taken by ambulance to the hospital where surgery prevented his paralysis from being permanent. The injury dominated Parcells’ postgame press conference.

Standings

External links 
 1997 statistics

New York Jets seasons
New York Jets
New York Jets season
20th century in East Rutherford, New Jersey
Meadowlands Sports Complex